Angus Jack Glover (born 8 September 1998) is an Australian professional basketball player for the Sydney Kings of the National Basketball League (NBL).

Professional career

Illawarra Hawks (2016–2020) 
Glover signed with his hometown Illawarra Hawks as a development player in 2016 after a youth career where he represented Australia nationally. In 2017, Glover tore his anterior cruciate ligament (ACL) for the second time and rehabilitated while contracted to the Hawks as he turned down an offer to play college basketball with the Saint Mary's Gaels.

Glover returned to play in 2019 and subsequently signed a two-year full contract with the Hawks. His remaining contract with the Hawks was voided when the club was liquidated on 18 May 2020.

Sydney Kings (2020–present) 
On 20 July 2020, Glover signed a three-year deal with the Sydney Kings.

References

External links
NBL profile

1998 births
Living people
Australian men's basketball players
Illawarra Hawks players
Point guards
Shooting guards
Sportspeople from Wollongong
Sydney Kings players